Géraud Christophe Michel Duroc (born de Michel du Roc; 25 October 1772 – 23 May 1813), 1st Duke of Frioul (Duc de Frioul), was a French general and diplomat who fought in the French Revolutionary Wars and the Napoleonic Wars. He was noted for his friendship with Napoleon Bonaparte, who appointed him as the first Grand marshal of the palace, the head of the Emperor's military household.

Early life and education
Du Roc was born in Pont-à-Mousson on 25 October 1772, to a family of the noblesse de robe from the Gévaudan. His father, Claude Du Roc, was a former captain of the dragoons who had retired to Pont-à-Mousson due to hearing loss. Du Roc entered the local military school in 1781, where he studied for eight years. He then entered the School of Artillery of Châlons as a second lieutenant, in March 1792. Around this time he removed the nobiliary particle de from his surname (changing it to Duroc), in the context of the French Revolution.

As a member of the nobility, Duroc opposed the new revolutionary government of France. This led him, in July 1792, to abandon artillery school and become an emigré soldier in the counter-revolutionary Army of Condé, at the beginning of the Revolutionary Wars. He soon changed his mind, however, and after the Battle of Valmy Duroc deserted the royalist army. Along with two other deserters, he was arrested by the French in Fresnes-en-Woëvre following the battle, and in March 1793 was allowed to return to Châlons to finish his education.

Revolutionary Wars
Duroc joined the Revolutionary Army on 1 June 1793, being assigned lieutenant en seconde of the 4th Foot Artillery Regiment, and advanced steadily in the service. Captain Duroc became aide-de-camp to Napoleon in 1796, and distinguished himself at Isonzo, Brenta and Gradisca in the Italian campaigns of 1796-1797.

He served in Egypt, and was seriously wounded at the Battle of Abukir. His devotion to Napoleon was rewarded by complete confidence. He became first aide-de-camp (1798), general of brigade (1800) then governor of the Tuileries Palace. After the Battle of Marengo, Duroc was sent on missions to Vienna, St Petersburg, Stockholm and Copenhagen.

Napoleonic Wars

As Grand Marshal of the Palace, Duroc was responsible for the measures taken to secure Napoleon's personal safety, whether in France or on his campaigns, and he directed the minutest details of the imperial household.

After the Battle of Austerlitz, where he commanded the grenadiers in the absence of General Oudinot, he was employed in a series of important negotiations with Frederick William III of Prussia, with the elector of Saxony (December 1806), in the incorporation of certain states in the Confederation of the Rhine, and in the conclusion of the armistice of Znaim (July 1809).

In 1808, he was created Duke of Frioul: his duchy was made duché grand-fief for his widow in 1813, a rare - but nominal - hereditary honour (extinguished in 1829), created in Napoleon's own Kingdom of Italy. In 1813, after the Russian campaign he was appointed to the Sénat conservateur as a senator.

After the Battle of Bautzen (20–21 May 1813), the Grande Armée made a slow pursuit of Allied forces. At Reichenbach on 22 May 1813, a cannonball ricocheted off a tree-trunk, hit Duroc in the stomach, tore open his belly and spilled out his intestines in a gory mess over uniform, saddle and horse, which Napoleon witnessed. While Duroc lay dying inside a farmhouse, he requested Napoleon's presence where he apologised to the Emperor for not being able to serve him further, asked him to be a father to his daughter, and then requested him to withdraw so that he was not present at the moment of death. Napoleon bought the farm and erected a monument to his memory.

Legacy

Duroc's remains were moved in 1847 to be buried in the Hôtel des Invalides, in Paris. His name is inscribed on the Eastern pillar of the Arc de Triomphe, on column 15.

The metro station Duroc of the Paris Métro is named after him.

References

 - which names as chief source for Durocs biography the Moniteur Universel (French official state periodical - 31 May 1797, 24 October 1798, 30 May 1813, &c.).
Heraldica.org - Napoleonic heraldry.
 An Historical Inquiry into the Principal Circumstances and Events relative to the late Emperor Napoleon in which are investigated The Charges Brought against the Government and conduct of that Eminent Individual, by Barclay Mounteney, Effingham Wilson, London, 1824, pg 168

1772 births
1813 deaths
People from Pont-à-Mousson
Grand Marshals of the Palace
Dukes of the First French Empire
French military personnel killed in the Napoleonic Wars
19th-century French diplomats
French commanders of the Napoleonic Wars
Grand Croix of the Légion d'honneur
Members of the Sénat conservateur
Ambassadors of France to Prussia
Names inscribed under the Arc de Triomphe
18th-century French nobility